Augusto Bracet (Rio de Janeiro, 14 August 1881 – Rio de Janeiro, 1960) was a Brazilian painter, drawer and professor.

Biography 

Was a pupil of the painters Zeferino da Costa, Daniel Bérard, Rodolpho Amoêdo, and Baptista da Costa.

Bracet dedicated himself to landscapes, the human figure and occasionally to historical themes.

In 1911, he won the Foreign Travel Prize and moved to Italy and France, studying with Morelli and Louis Billoul.

Was acting director of the School between 1938 and 1945 and permanent director from 1945 to 1948.

Main works 

 A traição de Judas (The treason of Judas)
 Lindóia
  (First hearing of Independence Anthem)

References 

 BRAGA, Teodoro. Artistas pintores no Brasil. São Paulo: São Paulo Edit., 1942.
 PONTUAL, Roberto. Dicionário das artes plásticas no Brasil. Rio de Janeiro: Civilização Brasileira, 1969.
 BRACET, Augusto.  100 anos de Augusto Bracet from 1981 with 55 pages.
 NEISTEIN, José.   A Arte no Brasil: dos primórdios ao século vinte, uma bibliografia seleta  from 1997 with 535 pages.
 LOUZADA, Júlio. Artes plásticas Brasil from 1986 with 60 pages.
 
 

 
1881 births
1960 deaths
Academic staff of the Federal University of Rio de Janeiro
Brazilian painters